This is a list of fast radio bursts. Items are listed here if information about the fast radio burst has been published.  Although there could be thousands of detectable events per day, only detected ones are listed.

Notes

References

Radio bursts
Unsolved problems in astronomy
Radio astronomy
Fast radio bursts